"Here We Are" is a song written by Vince Gill and Beth Nielsen Chapman, and recorded by American country music group Alabama.  It was released in June 1991 as the fifth and final single from their album Pass It On Down. The song reached number 2 on the Billboard Hot Country Singles & Tracks chart in August 1991.

Chart performance

Year-end charts

References

1991 singles
Alabama (American band) songs
Songs written by Vince Gill
Songs written by Beth Nielsen Chapman
Song recordings produced by Josh Leo
RCA Records singles
1990 songs